is Japanese a prime-time television jidaigeki series. From March 16, 1970 to March 15, 1999, 402 episodes and 15 seasons were broadcast. Also, a two-hour special aired on March 20, 2006, commemorating the fiftieth anniversary of the National Gekijō, which occupies the Monday evening 8:00–8:54 pm time slot on the TBS network, sponsored by Matsushita. It alternated, seasonally, with Mito Kōmon and Edo o Kiru.

The title character is Ōoka Tadasuke, a historical person who was a magistrate in the city of Edo (the forerunner of modern Tokyo) during the time of Tokugawa Yoshimune in the eighteenth century. The magistrate acted as chief of police, judge and jury. The show was a detective-courtroom program. Actor Gō Katō created the title character and played him throughout the life of the series.

Sōgen Asahina did the title calligraphy. Takeo Yamashita did the music. The series was produced by C.A.L. It has been widely rerun on terrestrial and pay satellite television in Japan. Some episodes available on DVD.

Cast

Gō Katō as Ōoka Tadasuke
Muga Takewaki as Iori Sakakibara (A doctor at the Koishikawa Yōjōsho (the Koishikawa "city hospital").)
Takashi Yamaguchi as Tokugawa Yoshimune
Chiezō Kataoka as Tadasuke's father
Masayo Utsunomiya as Yukie Tadasuke's wife
Shirō Ōsaka as Genjiro
Gentarō Takahashi as Tatsu
Kōtarō Satomi as Masakichi
Shigeru Amachi as Kamiyama
Kōji Wada : Kazama Shunsuke
Eitaro Matusyama : Mashiru no Sanji

References

External links
C.A.L site for Ōoka Echizen
TBS page for 2006 special
Fan site

1970 Japanese television series debuts
1999 Japanese television series endings
1970s Japanese television series
1980s Japanese television series
1990s Japanese television series
Japanese drama television series
Jidaigeki television series
TBS Television (Japan) dramas
Cultural depictions of Tokugawa Yoshimune